The men's 30 kilometre freestyle at the 2003 Asian Winter Games was held on February 5, 2003 at Ajara Athletic Park, Japan.

Schedule
All times are Japan Standard Time (UTC+09:00)

Results
Legend
DNF — Did not finish
DNS — Did not start

References

Results FIS

External links
Results of the Fifth Winter Asian Games

Men 30